Ted Woods (born c. 1940) is a retired Canadian football player who played for the Calgary Stampeders. He played college football at the University of Colorado Boulder.

References

Living people
1940s births
American football halfbacks
Canadian football running backs
Colorado Buffaloes football players
Calgary Stampeders players